Synchiropus postulus, the dwarf dragonet, is a species of fish in the family Callionymidae, the dragonets. It is found in the Western Indian Ocean.

References

postulus
Taxa named by J. L. B. Smith
Fish described in 1963